Deportivo Humaitá is a Paraguayan football (soccer) club from the city of Mariano Roque Alonso, in the Gran Asunción area. The club was founded in 1932.

History
The club took its name from the historic Paraguayan city of Humaitá.

It is the third oldest team from Mariano Roque Alonso and won 12 titles from the regional league of that city, before joining the Liga Paraguaya de Futbol and participating in the lower divisions with other metropolitan area teams. Its biggest achievement was promotion to the Paraguayan first division in 1993. It competed in the first division for three years before being relegated to the second division.

Humaitá currently plays in the "Primera División Chilo" which is equivalent to the fourth division.

Honours
Paraguayan Second Division: 1
1993
Paraguayan Third Division: 1
1988
Paraguayan Fourth Division: 1
2001

Paraguayan Second Division: 1
Runner-up (1): 1991.

External links
 Albigol: Deportivo Humaita Info
 Paraguayan Soccer Info

Humaita
Humaita
1932 establishments in Paraguay